Jawad Kadhim (born 14 October 1993) is an Iraqi footballer who currently plays for Al-Minaa in the Iraqi Premier League.

International career 

Jawad Kadhim was called up to the senior Iraq squad for a 2015 AFC Asian Cup qualifier against Saudi Arabia in November 2013. He made his international debut against Syria on 15 November 2013.

Honours

International
Iraq U-23
 AFC U-22 Championship: 2013

References

External links 
 

Iraqi footballers
1993 births
Living people
Iraq international footballers
Association football midfielders
Al-Karkh SC players
Al-Mina'a SC players
Al-Shorta SC players
Al-Diwaniya FC players